"A Suitable Marriage" is the fifth episode of the first series of the British television series, Upstairs, Downstairs. The episode is set in 1905. It is one of five episodes shot in black-and-white due to an industrial dispute.

"A Suitable Marriage" was among the episodes omitted from Upstairs, Downstairs''' initial Masterpiece Theatre broadcast in 1974, and was consequently not shown on US television until 1989.

Cast

Regular cast
 George Innes (Alfred Harris)

Guest cast
 Horst Janson (Baron Klaus von Rimmer)

Plot
In December 1905, Elizabeth Bellamy falls in love with Baron Klaus von Rimmer, a German who turns out to be homosexual.

He claims to be in Britain to work in his family's bank but that doesn't fool Richard. The Baron eventually admits to being an arms dealer who wants to sell a new naval gun mount to the British. Richard realizes exactly what he's up to - especially after the Baron offers him a bribe.

Before the police arrive to arrest him for arms dealing, he flees Eaton Place with the footman Alfred to Germany after they are caught by Rose in a compromising situation (i.e. having sexual relations.) Not wishing Elizabeth to know any of the real reasons for his departure, she is told that he is a spy.A Suitable Marriage www.imdb.com The  ″baron fled, dumping Elizabeth and taking Alfred with him instead!″''

References

See also 
 Rose's Pigeon

Upstairs, Downstairs (series 1) episodes
1971 British television episodes
Fiction set in 1904